The 1938–39 season was the 39th season of competitive football in Belgium. R Beerschot AC won their 7th and last Premier Division title. The next season of Belgian football was interrupted due to World War II. Official competitions resumed in the 1941-42 season.

Overview
At the end of the season, R Daring Club de Bruxelles and RFC Brugeois were relegated to Division I, while SC Eendracht Aalst (Division I A winner) and R Tilleur FC (Division I B winner) were promoted to the Premier Division.
FC Wilrijck, Cappellen FC, RCS Schaerbeek and Wezel Sport were relegated from Division I to Promotion, to be replaced by R Fléron FC, RCS Hallois, RRC Tournaisien and Herenthals SK.

National team

* Belgium score given first

Key
 H = Home match
 A = Away match
 N = On neutral ground
 F = Friendly
 o.g. = own goal

Honours

Final league tables

Premier Division

References
RSSSF archive – Final tables 1895–2002
Belgian clubs history 
FA website